See Joseph Henry Beale for the law professor.

Joseph Grant Beale (March 26, 1839 – May 21, 1915) was a Republican U.S. Representative from the state of Pennsylvania.

Biography
Joseph G. Beale was born near Freeport, Pennsylvania, in Allegheny County, Pennsylvania.  He graduated from Caton Academy in Turtle Creek, Pennsylvania, and from the Iron City Commercial College in Pittsburgh, Pennsylvania.

During the American Civil War, he enlisted in the Friend Rifles for three months, and later served as captain of Company C, Ninth Regiment, Pennsylvania Reserves, for three years.  He was taken prisoner and confined in Libby Prison, Richmond, Virginia, until released on parole.

He studied law and served as major in the Pennsylvania State Militia.  Discontinuing the study of law, he engaged in the coal business in the suburbs of Pittsburgh.  In 1868, he moved to Leechburg, Pennsylvania, and actively engaged in the iron and steel business.  He served as president of the Leechburg Banking Co.

Beale was elected as a Republican to the Sixtieth Congress, but was an unsuccessful candidate for renomination in 1908.  He resumed his former business pursuits, and died in Leechburg in 1915.  Interment was in Evergreen Cemetery.

References
 Retrieved on 2008-10-18
The Political Graveyard

1839 births
1915 deaths
Pennsylvania Reserves
Union Army officers
American Civil War prisoners of war
Republican Party members of the United States House of Representatives from Pennsylvania
19th-century American politicians
People from Allegheny County, Pennsylvania
Military personnel from Pennsylvania